Peralillo is a Chilean town and commune in Colchagua Province, O'Higgins Region.

Demographics
Of these, 5,882 (60.5%) lived in urban areas and 3,847 (39.5%) in rural areas. The population grew by 6.4% (585 persons) between the 1992 and 2002 censuses.

Administration
As a commune, Peralillo is a third-level administrative division of Chile administered by a municipal council, headed by an alcalde who is directly elected every four years. The 2021-2024 mayor is Claudio Cumsille.

References

External links
  Municipality of Peralillo

Communes of Chile
Populated places in Colchagua Province